Brikena Smajli (born 1970) is an Albanian writer, and a lecturer at the European University of Tirana.

Smajli was born in Shkodra, where she still lives.  She has been described as "a fine representative of a new generation of female writers in Albania".

Selected publications
Përdite ndërtoj shtëpi me ashkla (2006, Shtëpia Botuese albas: 
Të fundit vdesin ulkonjat : poezi (1997, Shtëpia botuese "At Gjergj Fishta")

References

1970 births
Living people
Albanian women writers
Albanian writers